James Kicklighter (born June 26, 1988) is an American film director, producer, and writer from Bellville, Georgia.

Early life and education 
Kicklighter's hometown is in Bellville, Georgia. His father died from SARS when he was 12 years old.  He graduated from Georgia Southern University with a degree in Public Relations.

Career 
He began his career at 18, as co-executive producer of That Guy: The Legacy of Dub Taylor, interviewing actress Dixie Carter, rocker John Mellencamp, director David Zucker, and actor Buck Taylor.

During his studies at Georgia Southern University, he collaborated with another student to film a documentary about the Golden Age of Radio for the Broadcast Education Association. While directing the film that became Theater of the Mind, he met Edith Ivey, who starred in his short film, The Car Wash.

The Car Wash won the Audience Choice Award at the National Film Festival for Talented Youth.

His short film Followed, based on the story by Will McIntosh, received an Audience Choice Award at the 2011 National Film Festival for Talented Youth, and was screened by Dragon Con, The Rome International Film Festival, Garden State Film Festival and Central Florida Festival, with international press coverage.

His 2012 film Final Acts was a finalist in the Macon Shorts Competition, part of the Gateway Macon Initiative. The film won Grand Prize.

His first feature film was the international crossover Desires of the Heart, which was produced by Jitenda Mishra and shot in Savannah, Georgia and Rajasthan, India in 2012. It was screened at film festivals in 2013 and 2014 including the Cannes Film Festival. The film was released in theaters across India in November 2015. It received award for Best Foreign Film at the La Femme Festival in Los Angeles.

In 2015, he released the documentary A Few Things About Cancer. The film won Best Short Documentary at the 2015 FirstGlance Los Angeles Film Festival.

His music video "Branches" for solo artist Shel Bee won Best Music Video at the 2016 Garden State Film Festival

After the 2016 Garden State Film Festival, Kicklighter directed the documentary Digital Edition, a profile on the future of journalism framed through The Atlanta Journal-Constitution. He was inspired to film the project after receiving an email from Bert Roughton, Jr., Senior Managing Editor of The Atlanta Journal-Constitution.

He was the Virginia filmmaker for Hillary Clinton's 2016 presidential campaign. He filmed content for the campaign with public figures such as Michelle Kwan. He decided to direct the film The American Question after observing politics and voting during the campaign.

In 2017, he directed Angel of Anywhere, starring Briana Evigan, Ser'Darius Blain, David A. Gregory, and Axel Roldos. The project was a collaboration was a collaboration with director of photography Jonathan Pope. 

He spoke about his start in filmmaking at the Directors Guild of America and the importance of networking  in March 2018.

Kicklighter directed the feature documentary The Sound of Identity, profiling Lucia Lucas's performance of Don Giovanni at the Tulsa Opera for 2021 release.  It received a rating of 91% on the review aggregator site Rotten Tomatoes.

Kicklighter is set to direct a biopic about athlete and coach Erk Russell, who revived the football program at Georgia Southern University.

Personal life 
Bag company JAMAH named The Kicklighter bag in his honor. He currently resides in Los Angeles, California.

Filmography

References

External links

1988 births
Living people
Georgia Southern University alumni
American documentary film directors
American male screenwriters
Writers from Savannah, Georgia
Film directors from Georgia (U.S. state)
Screenwriters from Georgia (U.S. state)
21st-century American screenwriters
21st-century American male writers